The South African national badminton team represents South Africa in international badminton team competitions and is controlled by Badminton South Africa, the governing body for badminton in South Africa. South Africa has participated in the Thomas Cup, Uber Cup and the Sudirman Cup but have never been to the quarterfinals.

South Africa is one of the leading badminton nations in Africa, winning all three team events at the African Badminton Championships for more than four times.

Participation in BWF competitions

Thomas Cup

Uber Cup

Sudirman Cup

Participation in African Badminton Championships

Men's team

Women's team

Mixed team

Current squad 
The following players were selected to represent South Africa at the 2022 All Africa Men's and Women's Team Badminton Championships.

Male players
Cameron Coetzer
Jarred Elliott
Caden Kakora
Ruan Snyman
Robert Summers
Robert White

Female players
Amy Ackerman
Demi Botha
Deidre Jordaan
Diane Olivier

References

Badminton
National badminton teams
Badminton in South Africa